Vancouver station may refer to one of the following:

 Waterfront station (Vancouver), an intermodal (formerly CPR) train station in Vancouver, British Columbia, Canada
 Pacific Central Station, a VIA Rail (formerly CNR) train station in Vancouver, British Columbia, Canada
 Vancouver station (Washington), an Amtrak station in Vancouver, Washington, United States